Shatin Plaza is one of the main private housing estates in Sha Tin Town Centre, Sha Tin District, New Territories, Hong Kong, which is near New Town Plaza Phase I, Lucky Plaza and Shatin Centre. Formerly Sha Tin Hui Bus Terminus, it comprises 4 high-rise buildings and a shopping arcade, developed by Henderson Land Development in 1988. Sha Tin station is the main station to interchange from Shatin Plaza (New Town Plaza).

See also
 Shatin Centre
 Private housing estates in Sha Tin District

References

External links

Official website of Shatin Plaza

Buildings and structures completed in 1988
Henderson Land Development
Private housing estates in Hong Kong
Shopping centres in Hong Kong
Sha Tin
Sha Tin District
Shopping malls established in 1988